The S50 expressway is a planned expressway in Poland, in Masovian Voivodeship. It will run as a circle road north to the Warsaw metropolitan area to take over the transit traffic from the existing expressway ring around the city, mainly from the S8 and S17 expressways, as well as will be one of the road connectors to the planned Solidarity Transport Hub. It was added to the motorway and expressway index by Polish government on 24 September 2019. Expected completion of the road, along with parallel A50 motorway is set on 2027.

See also 
 National road 50 (Poland)

References 

Expressways in Poland
Proposed roads in Poland